Arnold Martin Katz (July 30, 1932 – January 25, 2016) was a medical doctor, professor of cardiology, medical researcher, and author of medical textbooks and research articles.

Career 

Arnold Katz was born in Chicago, Illinois. His mother was a piano teacher. His father, Louis N. Katz M.D. was a cardiologist, winner of the Lasker Award and president of the American Physiological Society and American Heart Association. Katz attended the University of Chicago and earned a Bachelor of Arts in 1952.
He graduated as a medical doctor  from Harvard Medical School in 1956, and did his medical internship at the Massachusetts General Hospital, where he also serveded as medical assistant resident in 1959. He spent 1957-1958 studying protein chemistry in the Laboratory of Christian B. Anfinsen at the National Institutes of Health in Bethesda. Katz later worked in medical research at the  University of California at Los Angeles and the Columbia University in New York, becoming an established investigator of the American Heart Association. In 1969 Katz became the first Philip J. and Harriet L. Goodhart Professor of Medicine (Cardiology) at the Mount Sinai School of Medicine. In 1977 he moved to the University of Connecticut School of Medicine to become the first chief of cardiology. Since his retirement in 1998 he has been acting as visiting professor of Medicine and Physiology at Dartmouth Medical School. In 2008 he was also appointed Visiting Professor of Medicine at Harvard Medical School.

Katz published over 400 articles and edited or co-edited more than 15 books.  His single-authored text Physiology of the Heart is now in its 5th edition. Katz is the recipient of various awards including the 1975 Humboldt Prize, the Research Achievement Award of the American Heart Association, the Peter Harris Distinguished Scientist Award of the International Society for Heart Research, the Lifetime Achievement Award of the Heart Failure Society of America,  and the Medal of Merit of the International Academy of Cardiovascular Sciences. The American Heart Association renamed its young investigator award for basic research the Louis N. and Arnold M. Katz Prize in his honour.
Among his many contributions, Katz was the first to describe the protein Phospholamban.

Katz passed away at his home in Norwich, Vermont on January 25, 2016. He is survived by his wife of 56 years, Phyllis B. Katz, and their 4 children and 8 grandchildren.

Publications (incomplete list) 

Physiology of the Heart
Heart Failure: Pathophysiology, Molecular Biology, Clinical Management
 Effects of acetate and other short-chain fatty acids on yeast metabolism
Regulation of myocardial contractility 1958-1983: an odyssey
Regulation of coronary flow. 
 Registration of left ventricular volume curves in the dog with the systemic circulation intact. 
 Peptide separation by two-dimensional chromatography and electrophoresis. 

Influence of tropomyosin upon the reactions of actomyosin at low ionic strength.
Purification and properties of a tropomyosin-containing protein fraction that sensitizes reconstituted actomyosin to calcium-binding agents. 
Control of the activity of highly purified cardiac actomyosin by Ca++, Na+ and K+. 

 
 
 
 
 
 
 
 
 Katz AM "Biochemical "defect" in the hypertrophied and failing heart. Deleterious or compensatory" Circulation 1973;1076-1079.
 
 
 
 
 Katz AM. "Potential deleterious effects of inotropic agents in the therapy of heart failure. Circulation 1986;73(Suppl III):184-190.

References 

1932 births
2016 deaths
American cardiologists
Harvard Medical School alumni
Icahn School of Medicine at Mount Sinai faculty
University of Chicago alumni